Khidir mosque is a historical mosque of the XIV century. It is a part of Old City and located on Muslim Magomayev street, in the city of Baku, in Azerbaijan. The building was also registered as a national architectural monument by the decision of the Cabinet of Ministers of the Republic of Azerbaijan dated August 2, 2001, No. 132.

History
The mosque was built in 1301 on a street-stair. In turn, it affected the way of the architectural placement of the mosque.

In 1988, archaeological excavations on the lower floor of the dome and restoration works on the portal were carried out. The mosque was built on zoroastrian temple.

Architectural features
Proportional division of the interior, composition methods and stone elements are clearly expressed with vividly carving, and with mihrab with artistic expression the hall gets an interesting view. Straight profiled windows are installed on the south facade of the mosque. Through the whole perimeter of the mosque, the low-profiled crown expresses the methods of eastern composition.

Gallery

See also
Old City

References

Monuments and memorials in Azerbaijan
Mosques in Baku
Icherisheher